Charles Letcher (22 December 1868 – 30 November 1916) was an Australian cricketer. He played four first-class cricket matches for Victoria between 1888 and 1894.

See also
 List of Victoria first-class cricketers

References

External links
 

1868 births
1916 deaths
Australian cricketers
Victoria cricketers
Cricketers from Melbourne